Heo Il-young (born August 5, 1985) is a South Korean professional basketball player. He plays for Seoul SK Knights in the Korean Basketball League and the South Korean national team.

Early life
A native of Busan, Heo grew up playing baseball in elementary school. He was persuaded to switch sports and attended Dong-a High School, one of Busan's most notable high school basketball programs, and was schoolmates with national teammate Kim Tae-sul. As he was taller than most of his peers in high school, he played as a center, before converting into a forward in college.

Career

College
Heo went on to Konkuk University. During his senior year, he led the unfancied team to the final of the National Basketball Festival, a winter tournament contested by college teams and KBL D-League reserve teams, and was the tournament's top scorer.

Professional
Heo was the second overall pick of the 2009 KBL rookie draft and was chosen by Daegu Orions, which later moved to Goyang and became Goyang Orion Orions. Although he came from a lesser-known college basketball program, he emerged as the Orions' brightest prospects and dubbed the team's "solver" due to him scoring decisive points in the fourth quarter of crucial games. He finished his rookie season with an average of 10.5 points in 51 games.

In May 2012, Heo enlisted for mandatory military service and was assigned to the Sangmu team after completing basic training. He was discharged in January 2014.

During the 2019-20, Heo was plagued by a recurring hamstring injury which sidelined him for more than half the season's games. After the 2020-21 season ended, he became a free agent but chose not to renew with the Orions. He signed a three-year contract with Seoul SK Knights ahead of the 2021-22 season.

National team
In 2014, Heo participated in both the World Cup and the Asian Games. He was recalled for the 2018 Asian Games but missed out on the 2019 FIBA Basketball World Cup.

Personal life
Heo married his girlfriend of three years in April 2016. They have two children, a son and a daughter.

Heo is a fan of his hometown KBO League team Lotte Giants and has been spotted attending their home matches.

References

External links
 Profile at KBL.or.kr

1985 births
Living people
South Korean men's basketball players
Korean Basketball League players
Goyang Carrot Jumpers players
Seoul SK Knights players
Small forwards
Basketball players at the 2014 Asian Games
Basketball players at the 2018 Asian Games
Konkuk University alumni
Asian Games medalists in basketball
Asian Games gold medalists for South Korea
Asian Games bronze medalists for South Korea
Medalists at the 2014 Asian Games
Medalists at the 2018 Asian Games
2014 FIBA Basketball World Cup players
Sportspeople from Busan
20th-century South Korean people
21st-century South Korean people